Sohianwala, also transliterated as Soianwala, Sooianwala and Sooian Wala, is a village in the Punjab of Pakistan. It is located at 30°57'0N 70°51'25E with an altitude of 135 metres (446 feet).

References
Notes

Villages in Punjab, Pakistan